Sangam is a Pakistani Urdu film released in 1964.

Cast
Rosy
 Haroon
Sumita 
Khalil 

It was the first full-length colour movie made in Pakistan.

Production
The film was made in Bengali-speaking East Pakistan, and Raihan and much of the cast and crew were from there, but for commercial reasons it was produced in Urdu. 

Raihan's decision to film in colour was influenced by the first colour laboratory in Pakistan being located in Dacca, at the fledgling government-run East Pakistan Film Development Corporation.

Most of the film was shot on location in the Chittagong Hill Tracts. Kaptai Lake and its surrounding hills feature prominently.

Sangam was produced and directed by Zahir Raihan. It was released on Eid-ul-Azha Day, 23 April 1964.

Music
Khan Ataur Rahman composed the musical scores.

References

External links
 

Pakistani drama films
1960s Urdu-language films
Urdu-language Bangladeshi films
1964 films
Films scored by Khan Ataur Rahman
Urdu-language Pakistani films